Ciężkowice may refer to the following places:
Ciężkowice in Lesser Poland Voivodeship (south Poland)
Ciężkowice, Łódź Voivodeship (central Poland)
Ciężkowice, Opole Voivodeship (south-west Poland)